Boyle River may refer to:

 Boyle River (Ireland)
 Boyle River (New Zealand)

See also 
 Boyle (disambiguation)